Heinz Elzner (born 4 December 1928) is a retired German football defender and later manager.

References

1928 births
Living people
German footballers
SSV Ulm 1846 players
Hannover 96 players
Wuppertaler SV players
Association football defenders
German football managers
VfR Mannheim managers
SSV Jahn Regensburg managers
SpVgg Greuther Fürth managers
FC Augsburg managers
1. FC Nürnberg managers